Csaba Csordás (born 9 August 1977 in Kecskemét) is a Hungarian football player who currently plays for ASK Kohfidisch.

Kecskeméti TE 
Since 12 August 2006, Csaba Csordás has played in the Nemzeti Bajnokság II for Kecskeméti TE. In the 2007/08 season, he was a member of the Kecskeméti TE team that won the second division championship.

Honours 
Nemzeti Bajnokság I: Winner 1999
Hungarian Second Division: Winner 2008
FIFA World Youth Championship: 1st Round 1997

References
www.hlsz.hu
www.soccerterminal.com
www.kecskemetite.hu

1977 births
Living people
People from Kecskemét
Hungarian footballers
Association football forwards
Hungary youth international footballers
Hungary under-21 international footballers
Kecskeméti TE players
Budapesti VSC footballers
MTK Budapest FC players
Újpest FC players
Celldömölki VSE footballers
BFC Siófok players
Fehérvár FC players
FC Sopron players
Vasas SC players
Soproni VSE players
Nemzeti Bajnokság I players
Hungarian expatriate footballers
Expatriate footballers in Austria
Hungarian expatriate sportspeople in Austria
Sportspeople from Bács-Kiskun County